Eutypella scoparia is a plant pathogen that causes Eutypa dieback on pecan.

References

External links 
 Index Fungorum
 USDA ARS Fungal Database

Fungal tree pathogens and diseases
Nut tree diseases
Xylariales
Fungi described in 1823